The Hershey Community Center Building is an historic building which is located in Hershey, Dauphin County, Pennsylvania.

It was added to the National Register of Historic Places in 1980.

History and architectural features
Designed by architect Paul Philippe Cret (1876-1945), under a general plan by Milton S. Hershey (1857-1945), the Hershey Community Center Building was erected between 1932 and 1933. Plans for a community theater and center were originally drawn-up by C. Emlen Urban in 1915.  

The Hershey Community Center Building is a five-story building, encompassing 190,699 square feet. It is shaped like a distended "E," with an open court in the front center and sun porches on three sides.

It was added to the National Register of Historic Places in 1980.

References

Event venues on the National Register of Historic Places in Pennsylvania
Buildings and structures completed in 1933
Buildings and structures in Dauphin County, Pennsylvania
National Register of Historic Places in Dauphin County, Pennsylvania